Gymnocheta magna is a metallic green tachinid fly.

Distribution
Finland, Germany, Russia, Sweden, Switzerland, Netherlands, Ukraine.

References

Diptera of Europe
Tachininae
Insects described in 1958